Control panel may refer to:
 Control panel (engineering), a flat, often vertical, area where control instrumentation is mounted
 Control panel (software), the tool in the operating system which allows most or all of the settings to be changed through a user interface
 Control Panel (Windows)
 System Preferences, a computer program in the macOS operating system
 Web hosting control panel
 Plugboard, also called a control panel

See also 
 Telephone switchboard, a manual exchange
 Patch panel
 Dashboard